Pace count beads or ranger beads are a manual counting tool used to keep track of distance traveled through a pace count. It is used in military land navigation or orienteering. A typical example for military use is keeping track of distance traveled during a foot patrol.

Description
The tool is usually constructed using a set of 13 beads on a length of cord. The beads are divided into two sections, separated by a knot. Nine beads are used in the lower section, and four or more beads are used in the upper section. There is often a loop in the upper end, making it possible to attach the tool to the user's gear with a simple Larks head hitch.

Usage
There are two ways to use the beads. One is to represent the paces the user has walked, while the other is to represent the distance walked. Both methods requires the user to know the relationship between the paces walked and the distance travelled.

Counting paces
As users walk, they typically slide one bead on the cord for every ten paces taken. On the tenth pace, the user slides a bead in the lower section towards the knot. After the 90th pace, all nine beads are against the knot. On the 100th pace, all nine beads in the lower section are returned away from the knot, and a bead from the upper section is slid upwards, away from the knot.

In this manner, the user calculates distance traveled by keeping track of paces taken. To use this method, the user must know the length of their pace to accurately calculate distance traveled. Also, the number of paces to be walked must be precalculated (example: 2,112 paces= one mile, based on 30 inch pace) and then the distance traveled has to be calculated from the walked paces.

Distance walked
For every 100 meters the user walks, one of the lower beads is pulled down. When the ninth of the lower beads is pulled, the user has walked 900 meters. When the user has walked 1000 meters, one of the upper beads is pulled down, and all the lower beads are pulled back up.

Using this method the user must know the number of paces walked in 100 meters. An experienced user can also adapt the pace count for each hundred meters depending on the terrain. When using this method the user does not have to calculate distance from number of paces.

This method can of course be used for non-metric distances as well, though with the beads arranged in a different manner.

References

Beadwork
Length, distance, or range measuring devices
Mechanical calculators
Military personal equipment
Navigational equipment
Numeral systems